Mariano Monllor (born 28 February 1989) is an Argentine professional footballer who plays as a goalkeeper for Defensores de Belgrano.

Career
Monllor had a stint in the youth of Vélez Sarsfield. He began featuring for Primera C Metropolitana side Liniers from 2010, making ninety-seven appearances. He also scored for the club, netting a late free-kick in a draw with Dock Sud in October 2013. Monllor went on to join Dock Sud in the succeeding January. He featured sixty-seven times for them in three campaigns, as they secured a promotion play-off spot in the latter two seasons. In January 2016, Monllor switched tier four for Primera B Metropolitana by agreeing terms with Acassuso. He made his bow on 17 December versus Atlanta, replacing Julio Salvá on forty-one minutes.

July 2018 saw Monllor join Barracas Central of Primera B Metropolitana. In January 2022, Monllor moved to Defensores de Belgrano.

Career statistics
.

References

External links

1989 births
Living people
Footballers from Buenos Aires
Argentine footballers
Association football goalkeepers
Primera C Metropolitana players
Primera B Metropolitana players
Club Social y Deportivo Liniers players
Sportivo Dock Sud players
Club Atlético Acassuso footballers
Barracas Central players
Defensores de Belgrano footballers